Khaseh Tarash (also Romanized as Khāşeh Tarāsh; also known as Khavāş Tarāsh) is a village in Olya Rural District, in the Central District of Ardestan County, Isfahan Province, Iran. At the 2006 census, its population was 35, in 9 families.

References 

Populated places in Ardestan County